The town of Delden has 49 listings in the register of rijksmonuments.

List

|}

References
 Rijksdienst voor het Cultureel Erfgoed KICH Rijksmonumenten Dataset

Hof van Twente

Delden